In the 1975 Mediterranean Games, one of the games played was volleyball. Yugoslavia won the men's and the women's division.

Medalists

Standings

Men's competition

Women's competition

External links
 Complete 1975 Mediterranean Games Standings

Volleyball at the Mediterranean Games
1975 in volleyball
Sports at the 1975 Mediterranean Games